The Last Right is a 2019 British-Irish comedy-drama film written and directed by Aoife Crehan. The film premiered at the 2019 Cork International Film Festival.

Plot
On a journey from his home in New York to his mother's funeral in Clonakilty, County Cork, Daniel Murphy meets a fellow passenger who records him as his next of kin, and soon after dies.  Daniel's autistic brother (later to be revealed as his son, who had been raised by Daniel's mother), persuades him that he should facilitate the stranger's body being brought to Rathlin Island to be buried with his brother. This becomes possible when they do a favour for a local woman, and the three have a road-trip adventure amid a police attempt to prevent them and a building media interest in the story.

Cast
 Niamh Algar as Mary Sullivan
 Michiel Huisman as Daniel Murphy
 Samuel Bottomley as Louis Murphy
 Colm Meaney as Donald Crowley
 Brian Cox as Father Reilly
 Eleanor O'Brien as Sheila O'Neill
 Michael McElhatton as Frank Delaney
 Jim Norton as Padraig
 Donna Anita Nikolaisen as flight attendant
 Colm O'Brien as airport guard
 Clare Barrett as Teresa
 Eamon Rohan as Mr Crowley
 Julie Sharkey as Eileen Sullivan
 Helena Browne as landlady
 Barry Roe as Brian
 Catherine Byrne as Aunty Meg
 Aidan O'Hare
 Bryan Quinn

Reception
On Metacritic, The Last Right have a rank of 62 out of a 100 based on 4 critics, indicating "generally favorable reviews".

Donald Clarke of The Irish Times, the film is "very Irish", adding that it is "A reasonably likeable salute to a Magic Ireland we don't see much anymore". Kimberly Reyes of Film Ireland wrote "The journey's pacing is entertaining most of the way through but making comedy out of tragedy is an Irish specialty that shouldn't need to borrow any Americanness". Couple of days later, another contributor of the same publication, Liam Hanlon, praised the director and wrote that "[it's] a film that will make you eager to see what [Aoife Crehan] creates next". Brian Lloyd of entertainment.ie, called it "sweet and earnest" and compared the film to Rain Man and The Holiday.

Not all critics responded positively to the film. Alan Corr of RTÉ, wrote "This Christmas road trip comedy of errors from first time director Aoife Crehan loses its way". Irish Independents Chris Wasser called the film "frustrating", adding that "[it] result[s] in a film that is annoyingly broad and surprisingly lazy".

References

External links
 

2019 comedy-drama films
English-language Irish films
British road comedy-drama films
Irish comedy-drama films
Irish drama road movies
2010s English-language films
2010s British films